Ng Sik-ho (1930 – September 8, 1991), also known as "Crippled Ho" or "Limpy Ho" was a prominent Hong Kong drug lord and triad boss.

Biography
Ng, born in 1930, was of Teochew origin. Ng earned his nickname of "Crippled Ho" or "Limpy Ho" following a leg injury sustained in a street fight. He sneaked to Hong Kong from Mainland China during the Great Chinese Famine in the 1960s. 

From as early as 1967, Ng was involved in the illicit trade of opium and morphine. He was married to Cheng Yuet-ying, who was also involved in the drug trade. Ng built a drug empire that, at the time of his arrest, was said to have covered Hong Kong, Macau, Thailand, Taiwan, Singapore, Britain and America.

Ng was arrested in 12 November 1974 on charges of smuggling 20 tonnes of opium and morphine from Thailand and other countries into Hong Kong. Nicknamed "Mr. Big" by the media, Ng was convicted in May 1975 to 30 years of imprisonment, the longest sentence ever imposed by a Hong Kong court at that time. His wife was subsequently arrested and was convicted on 23 February to 16 years imprisonment and was fined 1 million yuan.

Ng became a key witness in the case against Ma Sik-chun, Ng's former associate who was facing charges of heroin and opium trafficking.

Ng became a Buddhist while in jail. In April 1991, his sentenced was reduced by the Governor of Hong Kong by four and a half years, and was scheduled to be released at the end of the year. In July, Ng was diagnosed with terminal liver cancer, and it was estimated that he would live no more than 6 weeks. His sentence was then further reduced.

On 14 August 1991, after serving 16 years in jail, Ng was released on medical grounds. He was moved to a guarded hospital cell to a ward at the Queen Mary Hospital. He died a few weeks later on September 8, 1991 at age 61. His wife was eventually released from prison in 1992.

Media portrayals
Ng Sik-ho's story has been adapted multiple times in Hong Kong cinema, and he served as a popular trope in Triad films. Fictional portrayals inspired by or involved Ng includes:
 Zeoi Fu Kam Lung (1976), portrayed by Lau Dan
 Blowing in the Wind (1980), portrayed by Lau Kong
 Hong Kong Criminal Archives - Black Money (1991), portrayed by Lam Lap Sam
 To Be Number One (1991), portrayed by Ray Lui
 Queen of Underworld (1991), portrayed by Ray Lui
 Lee Rock (1991), portrayed by Victor Hon
 Lee Rock II (1991), portrayed by Victor Hon
 The Greed of Man (1992), portrayed by Lau Kong
 The Prince of Temple Street (1992), portrayed by Lau Siu Ming
 The H.K. Triad (1999), portrayed by Sean Lau
 I Corrupt All Cops (2009), portrayed by Alan Chui Chung-San
 Beauty In the South (2012), portrayed by Liu Can
 Chasing the Dragon (2017), portrayed by Donnie Yen
 Once Upon a Time in Hong Kong (2021), portrayed by Tony Leung Ka-fai
 Extras for Chasing The Dragon (2023), portrayed by Jordan Chan
 Where the Wind Blows (2023), portrayed by Tse Kwan-ho

References

1930 births
1991 deaths
Triad members
Deaths from liver cancer
Drug traffickers
Chinese crime bosses
Hong Kong crime bosses
Hong Kong gangsters